Z7 may refer to :
 Z7, IATA code for ADC Airlines (1984-2007)
 Z7, IATA code for Zimbabwe flyafrica.com (2014-2015)
 Z7 Operation Rembrandt, a 1966 German-Italian-Spanish film
 Volari Z7, a graphic chip produced by XGI Technology
 Z07, a 1997 BMW concept car
 Nikon Z 7, a Nikon mirrorless camera